Vasser Sullivan Racing is an American organization involved in motorsports. It was founded in 2010 by James “Sulli” Sullivan as SH Racing to compete in motocross. In 2011, the team partnered with KV Racing Technology to form KVSH Racing. Following a two year hiatus after the demise of KV Racing Technology, Sullivan and former KV co-owner Jimmy Vasser announced that they had formed Vasser Sullivan racing. The organization has competed in racing series including: the Red Bull Global Rallycross Series under the SH Rallycross/DRR banner, the IndyCar Series where it has competed as co-entrants with KV as well as with Dale Coyne Racing, and the IMSA SportsCar Championship where it formerly partnered with Aim Autosport as Aim Vasser Sullivan before later competing independently.

James Sullivan

Sullivan founded SH Racing after graduation from Baylor University in 2003 with a Bachelor of Business Administration degree in Entrepreneurship.

In addition to racing, Sullivan co-founded sports nutrition supplement firm Protein Bullet and the Dallas-based private equity fund Modena Capital Group.

SH Rallycross 
SH Racing competes in Global Rallycross. With Scott Speed behind the wheel it competed in the 2013 X GAMES Los Angeles in a partnership with Dreyer & Reinbold Racing.

SH Rallycross/DRR was launched as SH Rallycross in 2014 to compete in the Red Bull Global Rallycross Series. The team captured the bronze medal, earning its first podium finish, in its third event at the 2014 X GAMES, in Austin, Texas. SH Rallycross/DRR is led by Sullivan, Dennis Reinbold and Jimmy Vasser. In 2016 it fielded a Ford Fiesta ST. SH Rallycross/DRR has made 33 RBGRC starts, earning 17 heat race wins, eight finals podiums and one finals victory. The team finished fourth in the championship standings in 2014 and 2015. It had its best season in 2015 with four podium performances in the finals, including a win in Washington, DC. It was the only Red Bull Global Rallycross SuperCar team to make it to each main (final) event.

KVSH Racing

KVSH Racing is co-owned by venture capitalist Kevin Kalkhoven 1996, Indy car champion Jimmy Vasser and Sullivan.

The group was formed in 2011, finishing eighth in the Indianapolis 500. The team won the Indianapolis 500 in 2013 with driver Tony Kanaan and fielded an entry in the IndyCar Series for four-time series champion Sebastien Bourdais. Bourdias is the only Indy car driver to win four consecutive championships, from 2004 to 2007. Bourdais finished 10th in the championship standings in 2014 and 2015. He was placed 14th in 2016 on the strength of 11 top-10 finishes in 16 races, including a victory at Detroit Race 1.

Results

Complete IndyCar Series results
(key)

References

External links
 KV Racing Technology
Auto racing teams established in 2010
WeatherTech SportsCar Championship teams
American auto racing teams
IndyCar Series teams